3 (three) is a number, numeral and digit. It is the natural number following 2 and preceding 4, and is the smallest odd prime number and the only prime preceding a square number. It has religious or cultural significance in many societies.

Evolution of the Arabic digit
The use of three lines to denote the number 3 occurred in many writing systems, including some (like Roman and Chinese numerals) that are still in use. That was also the original representation of 3 in the Brahmic (Indian) numerical notation, its earliest forms aligned vertically. However, during the Gupta Empire the sign was modified by the addition of a curve on each line. The Nāgarī script rotated the lines clockwise, so they appeared horizontally, and ended each line with a short downward stroke on the right.

The Indian digits spread to the Caliphate in the 9th century.  The bottom stroke was dropped around the 10th century in the western parts of the Caliphate, such as the Maghreb and Al-Andalus, when a distinct variant ("Western Arabic") of the digit symbols developed, including modern Western 3.  In contrast, the Eastern Arabs retained and enlarged that stroke, rotating the digit once more to yield the modern ("Eastern") Arabic digit "٣".

In most modern Western typefaces, the digit 3, like the other decimal digits, has the height of a capital letter, and sits on the baseline.  In typefaces with text figures, on the other hand, the glyph usually has the height of a lowercase letter "x" and a descender: "". In some French text-figure typefaces, though, it has an ascender instead of a descender.

A common graphic variant of the digit three has a flat top, similar to the letter Ʒ (ezh). This form is sometimes used to prevent falsifying a 3 as an 8. It is found on UPC-A barcodes and standard 52-card decks.

Mathematics 
3 is the second smallest prime number and the first odd prime number. It is the first unique prime, such that the period length value of 1 of the decimal expansion of its reciprocal, 0.333..., is unique. 3 is a twin prime with 5, and a cousin prime with 7, and the only known number  such that ! − 1 and ! + 1 are prime, as well as the only prime number  such that  − 1 yields another prime number, 2. A triangle is made of three sides. It is the smallest non-self-intersecting polygon and the only polygon not to have proper diagonals.

3 is the first Mersenne prime, as well as the second Mersenne prime exponent and the second double Mersenne prime exponent, for 7 and 127, respectively. 3 is also the first of five known Fermat primes, which include 5, 17, 257, and 65537. It is the second Fibonacci prime (and the second Lucas prime), the second Sophie Germain prime, the third Harshad number in base 10, and the second factorial prime, as it is equal to 2! + 1. 

3 is the second and only prime triangular number, and Gauss proved that every integer is the sum of at most 3 triangular numbers.

3 is the number of non-collinear points needed to determine a plane, a circle, and a parabola.

Three is the only prime which is one less than a perfect square. Any other number which is  − 1 for some integer  is not prime, since it is ( − 1)( + 1). This is true for 3 as well (with  = 2), but in this case the smaller factor is 1. If  is greater than 2, both  − 1 and  + 1 are greater than 1 so their product is not prime.

A natural number is divisible by three if the sum of its digits in base 10 is divisible by 3. For example, the number 21 is divisible by three (3 times 7) and the sum of its digits is 2 + 1 = 3. Because of this, the reverse of any number that is divisible by three (or indeed, any permutation of its digits) is also divisible by three. For instance, 1368 and its reverse 8631 are both divisible by three (and so are 1386, 3168, 3186, 3618, etc.). See also Divisibility rule. This works in base 10 and in any positional numeral system whose base divided by three leaves a remainder of one (bases 4, 7, 10, etc.).

Three of the five Platonic solids have triangular faces – the tetrahedron, the octahedron, and the icosahedron. Also, three of the five Platonic solids have vertices where three faces meet – the tetrahedron, the hexahedron (cube), and the dodecahedron. Furthermore, only three different types of polygons comprise the faces of the five Platonic solids – the triangle, the square, and the pentagon.

There are only three distinct 4×4 panmagic squares.

According to Pythagoras and the Pythagorean school, the number 3, which they called triad, is the noblest of all digits, as it is the only number to equal the sum of all the terms below it, and the only number whose sum with those below equals the product of them and itself.

There are three finite convex uniform polytope groups in three dimensions, aside from the infinite families of prisms and antiprisms: the tetrahedral group, the octahedral group, and the icosahedral group. In dimensions  ⩾ 5, there are only three regular polytopes: the -simplexes, -cubes, and -orthoplexes. In dimensions  ⩾ 9, the only three uniform polytope families, aside from the numerous infinite proprismatic families, are the  simplex,  cubic, and  demihypercubic families. For paracompact hyperbolic honeycombs, there are three groups in dimensions 6 and 9, or equivalently of ranks 7 and 10, with no other forms in higher dimensions.

The trisection of the angle was one of the three famous problems of antiquity.

There are three spatial dimensions in geometry.

Numeral systems 
There is some evidence to suggest that early man may have used counting systems which consisted of "One, Two, Three" and thereafter "Many" to describe counting limits. Early peoples had a word to describe the quantities of one, two, and three but any quantity beyond was simply denoted as "Many". This is most likely based on the prevalence of this phenomenon among people in such disparate regions as the deep Amazon and Borneo jungles, where western civilization's explorers have historical records of their first encounters with these indigenous people.

List of basic calculations

Science
The Roman numeral III stands for giant star in the Yerkes spectral classification scheme.
Three is the atomic number of lithium.
Three is the ASCII code of "End of Text".
Three is the number of dimensions that humans can perceive. Humans perceive the universe to have three spatial dimensions, but some theories, such as string theory, suggest there are more.
Three is the number of elementary fermion generations according to the Standard Model of particle physics.
The triangle, a polygon with three edges and three vertices, is the most stable physical shape. For this reason it is widely utilized in construction, engineering and design.
The ability of the human eye to distinguish colors is based upon the varying sensitivity of different cells in the retina to light of different wavelengths. Humans being trichromatic, the retina contains three types of color receptor cells, or cones.
There are three primary colors in the additive and subtractive models.

Protoscience
In European alchemy, the three primes were salt, sulfur and mercury.
The three doshas (weaknesses) and their antidotes are the basis of Ayurvedic medicine in India.

Pseudoscience
Three is the symbolic representation for Mu, Augustus Le Plongeon's and James Churchward's lost continent.
In Pythagorean numerology the number 3 is the digit that represents the communication. It encourages the expansion of creativity, sociability between people and movement. For Pythagoras, the number 3 was a perfect number, representing harmony, perfection, and divine proportion.

Philosophy

Philosophers such as Aquinas, Kant, Hegel, C. S. Peirce, and Karl Popper have made threefold divisions, or trichotomies, which have been important in their work.
Hegel's dialectic of Thesis + Antithesis = Synthesis creates three-ness from two-ness.

Religion

Many world religions contain triple deities or concepts of trinity, including:
The Hindu Trimurti
The Hindu Tridevi
The Three Jewels of Buddhism
The Three Pure Ones of Taoism
The Christian Holy Trinity
The Triple Goddess of Wicca

Christianity
The threefold office of Christ is a Christian doctrine which states that Christ performs the functions of prophet, priest, and king.
The ministry of Jesus lasted approximately three years.
During the Agony in the Garden, Christ asked three times for the cup to be taken from him.
Jesus rose from the dead on the third day after his death.
The devil tempted Jesus three times.
Saint Peter thrice denied Jesus and thrice affirmed his faith in Jesus.
The Magi – wise men who were astronomers/astrologers from Persia – gave Jesus three gifts.
There are three Synoptic Gospels and three epistles of John.
Paul the Apostle went blind for three days after his conversion to Christianity.

Judaism
Noah had three sons: Ham, Shem and Japheth
The Three Patriarchs: Abraham, Isaac and Jacob
The prophet Balaam beat his donkey three times.
The prophet Jonah spent three days and nights in the belly of a large fish
Three divisions of the Written Torah: Torah (Five Books of Moses), Nevi'im (Prophets), Ketuvim (Writings)
Three divisions of the Jewish people: Kohen, Levite, Yisrael
Three daily prayers: Shacharit, Mincha, Maariv
Three Shabbat meals
Shabbat ends when three stars are visible in the night sky
Three Pilgrimage Festivals: Passover, Shavuot, Sukkot
Three matzos on the Passover Seder table
The Three Weeks, a period of mourning bridging the fast days of Seventeenth of Tammuz and Tisha B'Av
Three cardinal sins for which a Jew must die rather than transgress: idolatry, murder, sexual immorality
Upsherin, a Jewish boy's first haircut at age 3
A Beth din is composed of three members
Potential converts are traditionally turned away three times to test their sincerity
In the Jewish mystical tradition of the Kabbalah, it is believed that the soul consists of three parts, with the highest being neshamah ("breath"), the middle being ruach ("wind" or "spirit") and the lowest being nefesh ("repose"). Sometimes the two elements of Chayah ("life" or "animal") and Yechidah ("unit") are additionally mentioned.
In the Kabbalah, the Tree of Life (Hebrew: Etz ha-Chayim, עץ החיים) refers to a latter 3-pillar diagrammatic representation of its central mystical symbol, known as the 10 Sephirot.

Islam
The three core principles in Shia tradition: Tawhid (Oneness of God), Nabuwwa (Concept of Prophethood), Imama (Concept of Imam)

Buddhism
The Triple Bodhi (ways to understand the end of birth) are Budhu, Pasebudhu, and Mahaarahath.
The Three Jewels, the three things that Buddhists take refuge in.

Shinto
The Imperial Regalia of Japan of the sword, mirror, and jewel.

Daoism
The Three Treasures, the basic virtues in Taoism.
The Three Dantians
Three Lines of a Trigram
Three Sovereigns: Heaven Fu Xi (Hand – Head – 3º Eye), Humanity Shen Nong (Unit 69), Hell Nüwa (Foot – Abdomen – Umbiculus).

Hinduism
The Trimurti: Brahma the Creator, Vishnu the Preserver, and Shiva the Destroyer.
The three Gunas found in Samkhya school of Hindu philosophy.
The three paths to salvation in the Bhagavad Gita named Karma Yoga, Bhakti Yoga and Jnana Yoga.

Zoroastrianism
The three virtues of Humata, Hukhta and Huvarshta (Good Thoughts, Good Words and Good Deeds) are a basic tenet in Zoroastrianism.

Norse mythology
Three is a very significant number in Norse mythology, along with its powers 9 and 27.
Prior to Ragnarök, there will be three hard winters without an intervening summer, the Fimbulwinter.
Odin endured three hardships upon the World Tree in his quest for the runes: he hanged himself, wounded himself with a spear, and suffered from hunger and thirst.
Bor had three sons, Odin, Vili, and Vé.

Other religions
The Wiccan Rule of Three.
The Triple Goddess: Maiden, Mother, Crone; the three fates.
The sons of Cronus: Zeus, Poseidon, and Hades.
The Slavic god Triglav has three heads.

Esoteric tradition
The Theosophical Society has three conditions of membership.
Gurdjieff's Three Centers and the Law of Three.
Liber AL vel Legis, the central scripture of the religion of Thelema, consists of three chapters, corresponding to three divine narrators respectively: Nuit, Hadit and Ra-Hoor-Khuit.
The Triple Greatness of Hermes Trismegistus is an important theme in Hermeticism.

As a lucky or unlucky number

Three (formal writing: , pinyin sān, Cantonese: saam1) is considered a good number in Chinese culture because it sounds like the word "alive" ( pinyin shēng, Cantonese: saang1), compared to four (pinyin: sì, Cantonese: sei1), which sounds like the word "death" ( pinyin sǐ, Cantonese: sei2).

Counting to three is common in situations where a group of people wish to perform an action in synchrony: Now, on the count of three, everybody pull! Assuming the counter is proceeding at a uniform rate, the first two counts are necessary to establish the rate, and the count of "three" is predicted based on the timing of the "one" and "two" before it. Three is likely used instead of some other number because it requires the minimal amount counts while setting a rate.

There is another superstition that it is unlucky to take a third light, that is, to be the third person to light a cigarette from the same match or lighter. This superstition is sometimes asserted to have originated among soldiers in the trenches of the First World War when a sniper might see the first light, take aim on the second and fire on the third.

The phrase "Third time's the charm" refers to the superstition that after two failures in any endeavor, a third attempt is more likely to succeed. This is also sometimes seen in reverse, as in "third man [to do something, presumably forbidden] gets caught". 

Luck, especially bad luck, is often said to "come in threes".

Sports
 In American and Canadian football, a field goal is worth three points.
In association football:
 For purposes of league standings, since the mid-1990s almost all leagues have awarded three points for a win.
 A team that wins three trophies in a season is said to have won a treble.
 A player who scores three goals in a match is said to have scored a hat-trick.
 In baseball:
 A batter strikes out upon the third strike in any single batting appearance.
 Each team's half of an inning ends once the defense has recorded three outs (unless the home team has a walk-off hit in the ninth inning or any extra inning).
 In scorekeeping, "3" denotes the first baseman.
In basketball:
 Three points are awarded for a basket made from behind a designated arc on the floor.
 The "3 position" is the small forward.
In bowling, three strikes bowled consecutively is known as a "turkey".
 In cricket, a bowler who is credited with dismissals of batsmen on three consecutive deliveries has achieved a "hat-trick".
In Gaelic games (Gaelic football for men and women, hurling, and camogie), three points are awarded for a goal, scored when the ball passes underneath the crossbar and between the goal posts.
In ice hockey:
 Scoring three goals is called a "hat trick" (usually not hyphenated in North America).
 A team will typically have three forwards on the ice at any given time.
 In professional wrestling, a pin is when one holds the opponent's shoulders against the mat for a count of three.
 In rugby union:
 A successful penalty kick for goal or drop goal is worth three points.
 In the French variation of the bonus points system, a team receives a bonus point in the league standings if it wins a match while scoring at least three more tries than its opponent.
 The starting tighthead prop wears the jersey number 3.
 In rugby league:
 One of the two starting centres wears the jersey number 3. (An exception to this rule is the Super League, which uses static squad numbering.)
A "threepeat" is a term for winning three consecutive championships.
A triathlon consists of three events: swimming, bicycling, and running.
In many sports a competitor or team is said to win a Triple Crown if they win three particularly prestigious competitions.
 In volleyball, once the ball is served, teams are allowed to touch the ball three times before being required to return the ball to the other side of the court, with the definition of "touch" being slightly different between indoor and beach volleyball.

Film

A number of film versions of the novel The Three Musketeers by Alexandre Dumas: (1921, 1933, 1948, 1973, 1992, 1993 and 2011). 
3 Days of the Condor (1975), starring Robert Redford, Faye Dunaway, Cliff Robertson, and Max von Sydow. 
Three Amigos (1986), comedy film starring Steve Martin, Chevy Chase, and Martin Short. 
Three Kings (1999), starring George Clooney, Mark Wahlberg, Ice Cube, and Spike Jonze. 
3 Days to Kill (2014), starring Kevin Costner. 
Three Billboards Outside Ebbing, Missouri (2017), starring Frances McDormand, Woody Harrelson, Sam Rockwell.

See also

Cube (algebra) – (3 superscript)
Third
Triad
Rule of three
List of highways numbered 3

References

Wells, D. The Penguin Dictionary of Curious and Interesting Numbers London: Penguin Group. (1987): 46–48

External links

Tricyclopedic Book of Threes by Michael Eck
Threes in Human Anatomy by Dr. John A. McNulty

The Number 3
The Positive Integer 3
Prime curiosities: 3

Integers